I Made It may refer to:

Albums

I Made It (Diamond Rio album), 2015

Songs

"I Made It" (Cash Money Heroes), 2010
"I Made It" (Fantasia song), 2016

See also 
 We Made It (disambiguation)